Dirty Harriet is the debut album by American hip hop recording artist Rah Digga. It was released via Flipmode/Elektra in 2000. The album went on to sell over 311,000 units in the United States. The album reached number 18 on the Billboard 200 albums chart and number three on the Top R&B/Hip-Hop Albums chart.

Critical reception
Entertainment Weekly wrote that "Dirty Harriet'''s production dream team ... takes a head-spinning tour through rap regionalism, from Southern booty bumps to East Coast Wu-Tangy coffin chillers." Exclaim! thought that the "gritty soundscapes are a potent backdrop to Digga's authoritative sandpaper-rough voice." The Washington Post'' wrote that "Digga is a punch-line MC who loves to draw out the final jab until it burns like a schoolyard taunt."

Track listing

Personnel

Rashia Tashan Fisher – vocals
Trevor George Smith Jr. – vocals (tracks: 6, 14), production (tracks: 2, 7), executive production
Roger McNair – vocals (tracks: 1, 14)
William A. Lewis – vocals (tracks: 1, 14)
Dewayne Battle – vocals (tracks: 9, 15)
Wayne Notise – vocals (tracks: 7, 14)
Rakeem Calief Myer – vocals (tracks: 9, 14)
Eve Jihan Jeffers – vocals (track 5)
Sonja Shenelle Holder – vocals (track 5)
Tyree Smith – vocals (track 9)
Aubrey King – vocals (track 9)
Brian Bostic – vocals (track 9)
Denton Dawes – vocals (track 9)
Jerome Derek Hinds, Jr. – vocals (track 9)
Salih Ibn Al Bayyinah Scaife – vocals (track 9)
Shakir Nur-al-din Abdullah – vocals (track 9)
Carlton Neron Thomas – vocals (track 13)
Leroy Jones – rapping (track 14)
Dominick J. Lamb – production (tracks: 8–9, 11–12, 14)
Michael Gomez – production (tracks: 5–6)
Dorsey Wesley – production (tracks: 15, 18)
Jerome Foster – production (track 1)
Walter V. Dewgarde, Jr. – production (track 3)
Peter O. Philips – production (track 4)
Dana Stinson – production (track 10)
Dave Atkinson – production (track 13)
Christopher Edward Martin – production (track 16)
George Spivey – production (track 17)

Charts

Weekly charts

Year-end charts

References

2000 debut albums
Rah Digga albums
Elektra Records albums
Albums produced by Nottz
Albums produced by Pete Rock
Albums produced by Rockwilder
Albums produced by DJ Premier
Albums produced by DJ Scratch
Conglomerate (record label) albums